The Latgale People Party was a political party in Latvia in the inter-war period.

History
The party won a single seat in the 1920 Constitutional Assembly elections. However, it did not contest any further elections.

References

Defunct political parties in Latvia